Ghar Ek Mandir is an Indian television show. which aired on Sony TV in 2000 on April 24, It was directed By Yatindra Rawat and produced By Balaji Telefilms and Ekta kapoor.

Plot 
The show centers around a middle class Indian family of Gopal a retired school principal, his wife Gayatri and their four children. The eldest son Rajesh is married to his love Sapna and has two children - daughter Rinky and son Bunty. The middle son Prem is to be engaged to a lawyer named Aanchal. The third son is Rahul. He is a law graduate but is unable to find any good employment. He is happy-go-lucky and shirks his responsibilities. The three brothers have a younger sister Archana who is immature and materialistic. Unfortunately, Prem dies due to a bomb blast on the day of his engagement to Aanchal, leaving his mother Gayatri in a state of shock. Gayatri desires to see Aanchal as a bride. Aanchal hasn't got over Prem yet while Rahul loves a spoilt rich girl, Mala. But due to family pressure to help Gayatri recover, Rahul and Aanchal get married. They consider this marriage as a sacrifice for their family’s welfare and do not have any intimate feelings for each other. Concurrently, Archana marries Aanchal's brother Vishwajeet, an emerging writer. The lives and stories of different characters are weaved together in this show, but the focus is on how Rahul and Aanchal slowly realize they are each other's soulmates and fall in love. They even end up consummating their marriage accidentally which leads to Aanchal getting pregnant with their first child, Pratham. With the arrival of baby Pratham, Gayatri recovers completely, believing that her Prem has returned to her at last. Throughout the course of the show, Rahul transforms into a more responsible person and together with Aanchal, supports his family.

Cast 
 Gautami Kapoor as Aanchal, main protagonist, lawyer, wife of Rahul
 Aman Verma as Prem ,second son of Gopal and Gayatri (dead)
 Ram Kapoor as Advocate Rahul, third son of Gopal and Gayatri
 Shweta Kawatra as Mala Singhal
 Madan Joshi as Gopal, retired school principal, husband of Gayatri, father of Rajesh, Prem, Rahul and Archana
 Shama Deshpande as Gayatri, wife of Gopal, mother of Rajesh, Prem, Rahul and Archana
 Mahesh Anand as Aman Singhal, underworld don and father of Mala and Siddharth
 Kiran Karmarkar as Rajesh, eldest son of Gopal and Gayatri
 Kishori Shahane as Sapna, Rajesh’s wife
 Kuljeet Randhawa / Urvashi Dholakia as Anjali, Sapna’s friend, Rajesh’s boss and lover
 Sujata Sanghamitra / Kainaaz Pervees as Archana, daughter of Gopal & Gayatri, wife of Vishwajeet
 Rituraj Singh as Vishwajeet
 Prakash Ramchandani as Gaurav
 Tasneem Sheikh as Meenakshi
 Gautam Chaturvedi as Manik
 Hiten Tejwani as Gautam
 Manish Goel as Ravi
 Moonmoon Banerjee as Kittu
 Rushad Rana as Siddharth Singhal
 Sameer Dharmadhikari as Raghu
 Neha Pendse
 Swati Anand
 Poornima Bhave as Megha
 Meenakshi Gupta as Vaidehi (before plastic surgery)
 Shilpa Mehta as Gaurav's Mother
 Rupa Divetia as Shanti, mother of Aanchal and Vishwajeet
 Romanchak Arora as Bobby
 Nitin Trivedi as Dr. Vasudev / Govind Patel
 Rajesh Kumar as Vilas
 Chandni Toor as Vaidehi (after plastic surgery) / Priyanka Patel
 Pratim Parekh as Mr. Rao
 Neha Mehta as Sharon
 Aparna Bhatnagar as Damini
 Pramatesh Mehta as Kishan (Gopal's younger brother; Gautam and Ravi's father)
 Niyati Joshi as Suman (Kishan's wife and Ravi's mother)
 Benika Bisht as Supriya (Ravi's girlfriend)
 Meenakshi Verma as Gautam's mother
 Kusumit Sana as Simrati Agarwal
 Yamini Singh as Sapna, Megha and Vaidehi's mother
 Manav Kaul as Abhishek

References

External links
 Official Website

Balaji Telefilms television series
Sony Entertainment Television original programming
Indian television series
Indian television soap operas
Serial drama television series
2000 Indian television series debuts
2002 Indian television series endings